is the rune denoting the sound p (voiceless bilabial stop) in the Elder Futhark runic alphabet. It does not appear in the Younger Futhark. It is named peorð in the Anglo-Saxon rune-poem and glossed enigmatically as follows:
 peorð byþ symble plega and hlehter / ƿlancum [on middum], ðar ƿigan sittaþ / on beorsele bliþe ætsomne
"Peorð is a source of recreation and amusement to the great, where warriors sit happily together in the beerhall."

The name is not comprehensible from Old English, i.e. no word similar to peorð is known in this language. 
According to a 9th-century manuscript of Alcuin (Codex Vindobonensis 795), written using the Gothic alphabet in Britain, the letters  p (based on a Greek Π) and  q (an inverted Π) are called "pairþra" and "qairþra", respectively.  One of these names clearly is derived from the other.  However, the names are not comprehensible in Gothic either, and it is not clear which is derived from which, although it is known that the Elder Futhark had a p, but no q rune. 
In any case, it seems evident that peorð is related to pairþra. 
The Anglo-Saxon futhorc adopted exactly the same approach for the addition of a labiovelar rune,  cƿeorð, in both shape and name based on peorð, but it is not known if the Gothic runes already had a similar variant rune of p, or if the labiovelar letter was a 4th-century creation of Ulfilas.

The Common Germanic name could be referring to a pear-tree (or perhaps generally a fruit-tree). 
Based on the context of "recreation and amusement" given in the rune poem, a common speculative interpretation is that the intended meaning is "pear-wood" as the material of either a woodwind instrument, or a "game box" or game pieces made from wood.

From peorð, Proto-Germanic form *perðu, *perþō or *perþaz may be reconstructed on purely phonological grounds. The expected Proto-Germanic term for "pear tree" would be *pera-trewô (*pera being, however, a post-Proto-Germanic loan, either West Germanic, or Common Germanic, if Gothic pairþra meant "pear tree", from Vulgar Latin pirum (plural  pira), itself of unknown origin). 
The Ogham letter name Ceirt, glossed as "apple tree", may in turn be a loan from Germanic into Primitive Irish.

The earliest attestation of the rune is in the Kylver Stone futhark row (ca. AD 400). The earliest example in a linguistic context (as opposed to an abecedarium) is already in futhorc, in the Kent II, III and IV coin inscriptions (the personal names pada and æpa/epa), dated to ca. AD 700. On St. Cuthbert's coffin (AD 698), a p rune takes the place of Greek Ρ. The Westeremden yew-stick (ca. AD 750) has op hæmu "at home" and up duna "on the hill".

Looijenga (1997) speculates that the p rune arose as a variant of the b rune, parallel to the secondary nature of Ogham peith. The uncertainty surrounding the rune is a consequence of the rarity of the *p phoneme in Proto-Germanic, itself due to the rarity of its parent-phoneme *b in Proto-Indo-European.

The rune is discontinued in Younger Futhark, which expresses /p/ with the b rune, for example on the Viking Age Skarpåker Stone,
iarþ sal rifna uk ubhimin
for Old Norse
Jörð skal rifna ok upphiminn.
"Earth shall be rent, and the heavens above."

References
A. Bammesberger, G. Waxenberger (eds.), Das fuþark und seine einzelsprachlichen Weiterentwicklungen, Walter de Gruyter (2006), 85-98 (Birkhan), 418f. (Schulte).
W. Krause. Die Sprache der urnordischen Runeninschriften, C. Winter (1971), p. 37

See also
Runic alphabet
Rune poem
Gothic alphabet
Ogham

Runes